Self-knowledge is a major topic in the ancient wisdom tradition Vedanta, and is acquired after the student makes certain preparations, such as the practice of austerities, cultivating calm, freeing oneself from cravings and aversion, and then performs the ātma-vicāra, or self-enquiry. This knowledge is that all things are one. The consciousness of the individual soul and the soul of God are the same.

This knowledge, while normally acquired under the direction of a guru or teacher, is not taught in the traditional sense, but is experienced directly by the prepared student, by the process of insight alone, who performs the vicāra.

In Vedanta 

Vedanta is a form of monism or advaita (non-dualism), which sees the world as being all part of a single whole. One of the earliest teachers of Vedanta was Adi Shankaracharya, who wrote commentaries which helped organize and explain the subtle concepts of the Upanishads. Shankara taught that the reason why we suffer in life is because we are seeking happiness, fulfillment, and completeness in the external world of forms, in the form of kama (sense-pleasure), artha (security), and dharma (civic duty). As one reaches the last two stages of life, one realizes that none of these things brought lasting happiness and a sense of completeness. Shankara taught that the source of our suffering is a form of ignorance. Therefore, no action will cure this affliction. The lasting remedy is in the form of knowledge alone, and this is the knowledge of the true nature of Self. Once this knowledge is attained, by direct experience, it is said that one attains a kind of lasting happiness, and this prepares one for transition out of the world of name and form, i.e., death of the body.

References 

 
Hindu philosophical concepts